

Beaulieu was a restaurant in Doorwerth Castle in Doorwerth, the Netherlands. It was a fine dining restaurant that was awarded one Michelin star in 1966 and retained that rating until 1979.

Head chef was Albert Emke.

See also 
 List of Michelin starred restaurants in the Netherlands

References 

Restaurants in the Netherlands
Michelin Guide starred restaurants in the Netherlands
Defunct restaurants in the Netherlands
Restaurants in Gelderland
History of Renkum